Jennifer Milmore (born October 1, 1969) is an American actress best known for her role as Carrie on the sitcom Jesse, which ran from 1998 to 2000 and Lauren on two episodes sitcom Friends in 1997.

Milmore appeared in the feature film To Wong Foo, Thanks for Everything! Julie Newmar (1995). She also played the part of Paige in the 2000 film North Beach.

In addition to her stint on Jesse, Milmore played roles in several other American network television series, including the role of Lauren in two episodes of Friends (1997). The same year, she played the role of a waitress in the pilot for sitcom Veronica's Closet.

Milmore has also appeared on 21 Jump Street (1991), Strong Medicine (2002), and Yes, Dear (2003).

Personal life
Born to Joan Marie Judge and John Edward Milmore, Milmore is of Irish descent and is one of five girls, including romance author Kaitlin O'Riley and playwright, television producer and actress Jane Milmore, and she is sister-in-law to Jane's husband, former The Golden Girls writer Richard Vaczy. Milmore married television/movie producer/screenwriter Greg Malins on November 21, 1999; they have two children.

References

1969 births
Actresses from New Jersey
American television actresses
Living people
People from Rumson, New Jersey
21st-century American women